is a Japanese football player.

Club career
Sato started his professional career in the J2 League. In 2010, after a trial with the Primera División de México club  Puebla FC, he signed a 4-year contract. The same year he was sent on loan to FB Gulbene, that time playing in the Latvian First League, in order to gain experience before joining Puebla FC back from loan. He scored 10 goals in 7 games there, attracting interest from other Latvian clubs. In March, 2011 he signed a contract with Virsliga club FK Ventspils for one season. He won the Latvian Cup with the team, beating Liepājas Metalurgs in the final. He played 12 matches there, without scoring any goals before being transferred to another Latvian Higher League team Skonto Riga in August 2011. Sato played 38 league matches, scoring 3 goals for Skonto during 2 seasons in the Latvian Higher League with the club. In March 2013 he was transferred to the Belarusian Premier League club Dinamo Brest.

In March 2014, Sato signed a two-year contract with FC Bunyodkor in the Uzbek League, and upon making his debut became Bunyodkor's 25th foreign representative.

In January 2018, Sato signed Gwangju FC.

On 27 August 2019, he signed with Russian Football National League side SKA-Khabarovsk.

Club statistics

Club

3Includes Baltic League.

Awards and honours

Club
Gulbene 2005
Latvian First League: 2010
Ventspils
Latvian Football Cup: 2010–11
Skonto FC
Latvian Football Cup: 2011–12

References

External links

	

1991 births
Living people
Association football people from Gunma Prefecture
Japanese footballers
Association football midfielders
Japanese expatriate footballers
Expatriate soccer players in the United States
Expatriate footballers in Latvia
Expatriate footballers in Mexico
Expatriate footballers in Belarus
Expatriate footballers in Uzbekistan
Expatriate footballers in Qatar
Expatriate footballers in South Korea
Japanese expatriate sportspeople in Latvia
Expatriate footballers in Russia
J2 League players
K League 2 players
USL League Two players
Qatar Stars League players
Thespakusatsu Gunma players
Indiana Invaders players
Club Puebla players
FB Gulbene players
FK Ventspils players
Skonto FC players
FC Dynamo Brest players
FC Bunyodkor players
Muaither SC players
Riga FC players
Gwangju FC players
FC SKA-Khabarovsk players